Walter Pavlicek (25 April 1926 – 24 November 2004) was an Austrian swimmer. He competed in the men's 200 metre breaststroke at the 1948 Summer Olympics.

References

External links
 

1926 births
2004 deaths
Olympic swimmers of Austria
Swimmers at the 1948 Summer Olympics
Place of birth missing
Austrian male breaststroke swimmers